Harry Smith (born 25 January 2000) is a professional rugby league footballer who plays as a  and  for the Wigan Warriors in the Betfred Super League and the England Knights at international level.

He has spent time on loan from Wigan at the Swinton Lions in the Betfred Championship, and the London Skolars in Betfred League 1.

Background
Smith was born in Widnes, Cheshire, England.

Career
In 2019 he made his Super League début for Wigan against the Catalans Dragons.

In round 4 of the 2022 Super League season, Smith kicked the winning drop goal for Wigan in their 29-28 victory over Toulouse Olympique.

In round 7 of the 2022 Super League season, Smith kicked the winning drop goal for Wigan as they defeated  Hull F.C. 19-18.

In the 2022 Challenge Cup semi-final, Smith was awarded man of the match honours for his performance in Wigan's 20-18 victory over St. Helens at Elland Road.

On 28 May 2022, Smith played for Wigan in their 2022 Challenge Cup Final victory over Huddersfield.  Smith scored a first half try and set up the match winning try towards the end of the match.

In round 19 of the 2022 Super League season, Smith scored a try and kicked eight goals in Wigan's 60-0 victory over Hull F.C.

International career
In 2019 he was selected for the England Knights against Jamaica at Headingley Rugby Stadium.

References

External links
Wigan Warriors profile
SL profile

2000 births
Living people
English rugby league players
London Skolars players
Rugby league halfbacks
Rugby league players from Widnes
Swinton Lions players
Wigan Warriors players